Vincent Adrien Pelluard (born 31 May 1990 in Joué-lès-Tours) is a French-Colombian cyclist specialising in BMX. Pelluard was the French BMX Elite champion in 2013.

He represented Colombia at the 2020 Summer Olympics.

Personal life 
In 2013, Pelluard started dating Colombian BMX rider Mariana Pajon. In 2018, he acquired Colombian citizenship.

References

External links
  (archive)
 
 
 
 

1990 births
Living people
BMX riders
Colombian male cyclists
French male cyclists
Olympic cyclists of Colombia
Cyclists at the 2020 Summer Olympics